Trauré Vera Cruz Martins (born 15 February 1995), known as just Trauré, is a Santomean footballer who plays as a defender for Aliança Nacional and the São Tomé and Príncipe national team.

International career
Trauré made his professional debut with the São Tomé and Príncipe national team in a 2–0 2021 Africa Cup of Nations qualification loss to Sudan on 24 March 2021.

References

External links
 
 

1995 births
Living people
São Tomé and Príncipe footballers
São Tomé and Príncipe international footballers
Association football defenders
Sporting Praia Cruz players